Klestovo is a rural locality (a village) in Yayvinskoye Urban Settlement, Alexandrovsky District, Perm Krai, Russia. The population was 20 as of 2010.

Geography 
Klestovo is located 35 km northwest of Alexandrovsk (the district's administrative centre) by road. Yayva is the nearest rural locality.

References 

Rural localities in Alexandrovsky District